If Life Was Easy is the fifth solo album by Deep Purple's bass player Roger Glover released by earMusic/edel on July 11, 2011. The album was recorded in 2007 but due to personal reasons it wasn't released until 2011. Like its predecessor, Snapshot (2002), it features The Guilty Party which includes Randall Bramblett and Gillian Glover. Guest appearances are from Nazareth's Dan McCafferty and Pete Agnew as well as Walther Gallay and Sahaj Ticotin.

Track list
Written By Roger Glover, except noted
 "Don't Look Now (Everything Has Changed)" (Roger Glover/Randall Bramblett)
 "The Dream I Had"
 "Moonlight"
 "The Car Won't Start"
 "Box of Tricks"
 "Stand Together" (Glover/Bramblett)
 "If Life Was Easy"
 "Welcome To The Moon"
 "Set Your Imagination Free" (Glover/Gillian Glover)
 "When Life Gets to the Bone"
 "When The Day Is Done"
 "Get Away (Can't Let You)" (Glover/Glover)
 "Staring Into Space"
 "The Ghost Of Your Smile"
 "Cruel World"
 "Feel Like a King"

Personnel
 Roger Glover – bass, vocals, baglama, guitar, piano, programming, percussion, harmonica, synthesizer
 Randall Bramblett – vocals, keyboards, saxophone
 Joe Bonadio – drums, percussion, electric drill
 Oz Noy – guitars
 Harvey Jones – synthesizers
 Eliot Denenberg – drums, guitar atmosphere
 Joe Mennonna – horns, horn arrangement
 Nick Moroch – guitar
 Dan McCafferty – vocals
 Pete Agnew – vocals
 Gillian Glover – vocals
 Walther Gallay – vocals
 Mickey Lee Soule – vocals
 Sahaj Ticotin – vocals
 Sim Jones – strings, string arrangement
 Don Airey – pianet

Production notes
Produced by Roger Glover and Peter Denenberg.
Pre-production recording by Roger Glover.
Recorded and mixed by Peter Denenberg at Acme Studios, Mamaroneck, New York.
Assisted by Jonathan Jetter and Michael Messier.
Cover art: front photograph by Roger Glover, finessed by Travis Porter, portrait by Myriam Freitag.

References

External links 
 Roger-Glover.com

2011 albums
Roger Glover albums